Oecobius amboseli is a species of wall spider in the family Oecobiidae. It is found in Egypt, Ethiopia, Kenya, Uganda, and Rwanda.  It  is an invasive species in Denmark, Netherlands, and Belgium.

References

Oecobiidae
Articles created by Qbugbot
Spiders described in 1974